Schizostachyum chinense is a species of bamboo (tribe Bambuseae of the family Poaceae). The species is endemic to Yunnan, found from 1,500 to 2,500 m.

Taxonomy 
The species has also been treated as the sole species in the genus Leptocanna, where it was known as Leptocanna chinensis. Phylogenetically, Leptocanna is an intermediate genus between Melocanna and Schizostachyum.

Use 
Natives of Southeast Yunnan use this species for the making of gao-sheng, a kind of native rocket used in festivals. The culm of this species is good for weaving.

References 

Bambusoideae
Endemic flora of Yunnan
Grasses of China